Telipna ja is a butterfly in the family Lycaenidae. It is found in Cameroon and the Republic of the Congo.

References

Butterflies described in 1926
Poritiinae
Taxa named by George Thomas Bethune-Baker